Bubbi Morthens (full name Ásbjörn Kristinsson Morthens; born 6 June 1956) is an Icelandic-Danish-Norwegian singer and songwriter. Aside from a lengthy solo career, he has been a member of such Icelandic bands as Utangarðsmenn and Egó.

Personal life 
Bubbi was born in Reykjavík to a Danish mother and a half-Norwegian, half-Icelandic father. Bubbi is a common nickname for Ásbjörn.

He developed a strong addiction to cocaine and alcohol in his youth, later in life he became an advocate for sobriety and addiction prevention. In 2018 he published the poetry book Rof about the sexual abuse he was a victim of as a child.

In 1973 (at the age of 17), Bubbi became a migrant worker.

In 2004, the documentary Blindsker about the life of Bubbi was released.

In 2020, a musical based on the life of Bubbi, named  ("Nine Lives") was shown in Reykjavík City Theatre.

Career

Bubbi recorded his first solo album in 1979, a blend of rock, blues and reggae, and published it the following year as Ísbjarnarblús.

In Utangarðsmenn
His first important band was Utangarðsmenn (The Outsiders), a punk band that led the new wave movement in Iceland. The band was formed with Michael D. Pollock (Mickey Dean), Daniel Pollock (Dirty Dan), drummer Magnús Stefánsson and bassist Rúnar Erlingsson. Utangarðsmenn gained renown in Iceland by means of extensive press coverage and several gigs, including three at Laugardalshöll, Iceland's biggest sports arena, where one of the gigs they performed was as supporting band for The Clash. Bubbi left the band after the second album, Í Upphafi Skyldi Endinn Skoða in 1981, and the others continued the band with the new name "Bodies".

In Egó
At that time, Bubbi and his brother, Bergþór, were joined by bassist Þorleifur Guðjónsson, and formed the band Egó. The band had their first tour in Reykjavík when Magnús Stefánsson and Tómas Magnús Tómasson replaced departing original band members. The band's debut album, Breyttir Tímar, released 1 April 1982, became one of the best-selling albums in Icelandic music history, climbing to second place on the Icelandic album chart, and staying in the top ten for 19 weeks. During the promotional tour for the album in Iceland, Þorleifur left the band and was replaced by Rúnar Erlingsson.

Egó followed up with Í Mynd the same year and it was considered better than the previous album. With this release, Egó toured Scandinavia, where Magnús decided to leave the band and was replaced by Jökull Úlfsson, and the band was extended once more with the addition of Gunnar Rafnsson on keyboards.

Internal conflicts led the band to break up but, having signed a contract under which they were obliged to release another album, they did not split up until after releasing their final work in 1984. Bubbi left Iceland and the musicians continued along different paths. In 2001, Egó reunited to release a compilation under the title of Frá upphafi til enda.

In Das Kapital
Later in 1984, Bubbi returned to Iceland and formed a rock and roll band called Das Kapital and released an album called Lili Marlene; the band broke up afterwards.

Solo
In 1985, he signed with Swedish record label Mistlur, and released Frelsi til Sölu (Freedom for Sale) which brought further commercial success. Dögun (Dawning), was released in 1987, and became a smash success. Bubbi's popularity was finally established in 1990 with the release of Sögur af Landi, which received good reviews.

In MX-21

Towards 1987 Bubbi joined guitarist Þorsteinn Magnússon (former member of Þeyr), Jakob Smári Magnússon (former bassist of Tappi Tíkarrass), drummer Halldór Lárusson and keyboardist Tómas Magnús Tómasson to form a new group called MX-21. The band collaborated with Megas and Sykurmolarnir (later known as The Sugarcubes) on Skytturnar, the soundtrack to the film directed by Friðrik Þór Friðriksson.

Solo
By the early 1990s, Bubbi was planning to record a Spanish-language album; this work was consolidated with the release of Von (Hope), which was recorded in Cuba with the band Sierra Maestra. In 1993, Bubbi moved towards a mellower country music style with the release of Lífið er Ljúft (Life is Good), and in 1994 experimented with rap music in the album 3 Heimar (3 Worlds).

In G.C.D.

In the 1990s, Bubbi joined Rúnar Júlíusson to form a rock band called G.C.D. He recorded a tribute album for his beloved crooner uncle, Haukur Morthens, and a spoken word album of original poetry in 1996. In 1998, Arfur (Heritage), an album featuring traditional Icelandic rhymes and ballads, was released.

Discography

With Utangarðsmenn, (1980–1981)

EPs
 1980 – Ha ha ha (Rækjureggae) (Steinar)
 1981 – 45 RPM (Steinar)

Albums
 1980 – Geislavirkir (Steinar)
 1981 – Í Upphafi Skyldi Endinn Skoða (Steinar), compilation release
 1994 – Utangarðsmenn (Japís), Live
 2000 – Fuglinn Er Floginn (Skífan), compilation release

Collaborations
 1981 – Flugur (Steinar) Icelandic compilation
 1981 – Gæðapopp (???), Icelandic compilation
 1981 – Northern Lights Playhouse (Fálkinn), Icelandic compilation
 1982 – Næst á Dagskrá (Steinar), Icelandic compilation
 1985 – Með Lögum Skal Land Byggja (Steinar), Icelandic compilation
 1998 – Nælur (Spor) compilation

Discography of Egó
Discography of Egó (1982–1984, 2001, 2009–present):

Albums
 1982 – Breyttir Tímar (Steinar)
 1982 – Í Mynd (Steinar)
 1984 – Egó (Steinar)
 2001 – Frá upphafi til enda (Skífan), compilation release
 2009 – 6. október (Sena)

Singles
 2009 – "Kannski Varð Bylting Vorið 2009" (Sena); only released on the internet
 2009 – "Í Hjarta Mér" (Sena); only released on the internet
 2009 – "Fallegi Lúserinn Minn" (Sena); only released on the internet
 2009 – "Ástin Ert Þú Á Litinn" (Sena); only released on the internet
 2009 – "Engill Ræður För" (Sena); only released on the internet
 2014 – "Ég fyrirgef þér allt"

Featuring on film
 1982 – Rokk í Reykjavík (Íslenska kvikmyndasamsteypan), documentary directed by Friðrik Þór Friðriksson
 2004 – Blindsker

Discography of Das Kapital

Album
 1984 – Lili Marlene (Gramm)

Featuring
 1987 – Geyser – Anthology of the Icelandic Independent Music Scene of the Eighties (Enigma Records), Icelandic compilation

Discography of MX-21

Singles
 1987 – Skapar Fegurðin Hamingju? (Gramm)

Discography of Bubbi and Megas

Album
 1988 – Bláir Draumar (Gramm)

Discography of G.C.D.

Albums
 1991 – G.C.D. (Steinar)
 1993 – Svefnvana (Skífan)
 1995 – Teika (Skífan)
 2002 – Mýrdalssandur (Skífan), compilation release

Discography of Bubbi Morthens and Björn Jr. Friðbjörnsson

Singles
 2008 – "Ég er kominn heim" (Sena), Only released on the internet

Featuring
 2008 – Pottþétt 46 (Sena)

Discography of Bubbi Morthens and Björgvin Halldórsson

Singles
 2013 – "Það er gott að elska" (from the Duet 3 album)
Discography of Bubbi Morthens and Dimma

• 2015 - Bubbi & Dimma

• 2016 - Minnismerki

Discography of Bubbi Morthens and Spaðadrottningarnar

• 2015 - 18 konur

Bubbi Morthens solo discography

Solo albums
 1979 – Ísbjarnarblús (Bubbi/Iðunn)
 1981 – Plágan (Steinar)
 1983 – Fingraför (Steinar)
 1983 – Línudans (Steinar), compilation release
 1984 – Ný Spor (Safarí)
 1985 – Kona (Gramm)
 1986 – Blús fyrir Rikka (Gramm)
 1987 – Frelsi til Sölu (Gramm)
 1987 – Dögun (Gramm)
 1988 – Serbian Flower (Mistlur)
 1989 – Nóttin Langa (Geisli)
 1990 – Fingraför (Steinar)
 1990 – Sögur af Landi (Steinar)
 1991 – Ég er (Steinar)
 1992 – Von (Steinar)
 1993 – Lífið er Ljúft (Skífan)
 1994 – 3 Heimar (Skífan)
 1995 – Í Skugga Morthens (Skífan)
 1996 – Allar Áttir (Skífan)
 1996 – Hvíta Hliðin á Svörtu (Mál & Menning)
 1997 – Trúir Þú á Engla (Skífan)
 1998 – Arfur (Skífan)
 1999 – Sögur 1980–1990 (Íslenskir Tónar), compilation release
 2000 – Bellman (Skífan)
 2000 – Sögur 1990–2000 (Íslenskir Tónar), compilation release
 2001 – Nýbúinn (Skífan)
 2002 – Sól að Morgni (Skífan)
 2003 – 1000 Kossa Nótt (Skífan)
 2004 – Blindsker (Skífan), Soundtrack
 2004 – Tvíburinn (Skífan)
 2005 – Ást (Skífan)
 2005 – Í 6 Skrefa Fjarlægð frá Paradís (Skífan)
 2005 – Gleðileg Jól (Tolli/Bónus)
 2006 – Bláir (Íslenskir Tónar)
 2006 – Lögin Mín (Sena)
 2006 – 06.06.06 (Sena)
 2007 – Góð Verk 07 (Stafræn útgáfa fyrir iPod) (Sena/Apple), compilation release
 2008 – Fjórir Naglar (Sena/Blindsker)
 2008 – Bubbi og Stórsveit Reykjavíkur (Sena/Blindsker)
 2010 – Sögur Af Ást, Landi og Þjóð 1980–2010 (Sena), compilation release, 3XCD+DVD
 2011 – Ég Trúi Á Þig (Sena)
 2012 – Þorpið (Sena)
 2013 – Stormurinn (Sena)
 2013 – Æsku minnar jól (Sena)
 2015 – 18 konur (Tónlist.is) with Spaðadrottningarnar
 2015 – Bubbi & Dimma (Prime Umboðsskrifstofa) with Dimma, live album
 2016 – Minnismerki (Prime Umboðsskrifstofa) with Dimma, live album
 2017 – Tungumál (Prime Umboðsskrifstofa)
 2019 – Regnbogans Stræti 
 2021 – Sjálfsmynd

Solo EPs
 1988 – 56 (Gramm)
 1989 – Hver er Næstur? (Geisli)
 1999 – Mér Líkar Það (Íslenskir Tónar)

Solo singles
 1988 – "Moon in the Gutter" (Mistlur); taken from the Mistlur LP Serbian Flower
 2004 – "Nei Nei Nei – Tjáningarfrelsi" (Skífan)
 2005 – "Þú" (Skífan); taken from Ást; only released on the internet
 2005 – "Ástin Getur Aldrei Orðið Gömul Frétt", Taken from Í 6 Skrefa Fjarlægð Frá Paradís (Skífan); only released on the internet
 2006 – "Grafir Og Bein" (Sena), Taken from Lögin Mín; only released on the internet
 2007 – "Ísbjarnarblús" (Sena); only released on the internet
 2008 – "Ég Er Kominn Heim" with Björn Jr. Friðbjörnsson, (Sena); only released on the internet
 2010 – "Sól" (Sena); only released on the internet
 2011 – "Ísabella" (Sena); only released on the internet
 2011 – "Blik Þinna Augna" (Sena); only released on the internet
 2011 – "Háskaleikur" (Sena); only released on the internet
 2012 – "Þorpið" with Mugison (Sena); only released on the internet
 2013 – "Brosandi börn"
 2013 – "Allt var það krónunni að kenna"
 2013 – "Trúðu á ljósið"
 2013 – "Hátíð í bæ"
 2014 – "Ég fyrirgef þér allt"

Related bibliography

References

1956 births
Living people
Bubbi Morthens
Bubbi Morthens
Bubbi Morthens
Bubbi Morthens
Bubbi Morthens